This is a partial list of equipment currently used by the Austrian Armed Forces.

Equipment

Infantry weapons

Armoured vehicles and specialized equipment

Aircraft

References

Military equipment of Austria
Austria
Equipment